Written Lives (Spanish: Vidas Escritas) is a collection of biographical sketches of famous literary figures, written by Spanish author Javier Marías and originally published in 1992. Margaret Jull Costa's English translation was published by New Directions in 2006.

Authors featured include:
 Djuna Barnes
 Joseph Conrad
 Arthur Conan Doyle
 Isak Dinesen
 Marie du Deffand
 William Faulkner
 Henry James
 James Joyce
 Rudyard Kipling
 Malcolm Lowry
 Thomas Mann
 Yukio Mishima
 Vladimir Nabokov
 Rainer Maria Rilke
 Arthur Rimbaud
 Laurence Sterne
 Robert Louis Stevenson
 Giuseppe Tomasi di Lampedusa
 Ivan Turgenev
 Oscar Wilde

There is also, towards the end of the book, a section entitled 'Fugitive Women', which includes shorter sketches of Emily Brontë, Julie de Lespinasse, Violet Hunt, Vernon Lee, Adah Isaacs Menken and Lady Hester Stanhope. The final chapter, 'Perfect Artists', looks more generally at the tradition of the literary artist.

References

External links
"The Evolution of Biography" by Peter Parker, Times Literary Supplement, May 3, 2006.
Written Lives at Complete Review. Includes links to many reviews.

1992 non-fiction books
Spanish books
Books about writers